Sabina Grzimek (born 12 November 1942 in Rome; also spelled Sabine) is a German sculptor. She is the daughter of sculptor Waldemar Grzimek.

References

External links 
 
 

German sculptors
German women sculptors
1942 births
Living people
21st-century German women artists